m  A majority of Mannadiars are land owners, agriculture being their traditional occupation, ranging from farmers to large feudal landlords (jenmis). Also, some of them are engaged in retail and wholesale trading businesses in Palakkad. The house (tharavad) of Mannadiars is called "Mannattu" like Illams for Namboothiris.

Etymology
Mannadiar is an honorific title possessed by ancient landlords.

History
According to epigraphical and literary evidence there was marriage of a Chola princess into the Chera royal family, and the subsequent movement of 8,000 Kongu Vellalars to Chera Nadu. Recorded in the Mezhi Vilakkam are the landed rights of Vellalas in Kochi, Kollam, Kozhikode and Palakkad. C. M. Ramachandra Chettiar wrote of a Kongu-Chera war about 1,000 years ago after which Kongu generals stayed back in Chera Nadu.

It is believed the Mannadiyars were descendants of these Kongu Vellalars. Mannadiyars and Kongu Vellalars were both disciples of the Melmatam in Perur. The Tamil palm leaf manuscripts in the possession of Mannadiyars, traditions like the Kamba Ramayana, and similar village names between Kongu Nadu and Palakkad  further support this theory.

Religion 

Mannadiars identify themselves belonging to Kshatriya varna. Majority of them are Vaishnavites  

The serpent is also worshipped by Mannadiar families (mostly in Valluvanad areas) as a guardian of the clan. The worship of snakes,  is so prevalent in the area that one anthropologist notes: "In no part of the world is snake worship more general than in Kerala." Serpent groves (Pāmpin Kāvú) were found in the southwestern corner of Many of the Mannadiar Tharavad compound and Sarpa Pooja will be performed once a year by the family members.

Traditions and customs

See also
 Tharakan (Hindu caste)

References

Social groups of Kerala
Indian castes